Vladimir Mikhailovich Bochkov (1 July 1946 – 31 March 2022) was a Russian politician. A member of United Russia, he served in the Federation Council from 2013 to 2018. He died on 31 March 2022, at the age of 75.

References

1946 births
2022 deaths
21st-century Russian politicians
Members of the Federation Council of Russia (after 2000)
United Russia politicians
Communist Party of the Soviet Union members
People from Ivanovo
Recipients of the Order of Honour (Russia)